The Central Department of Mathematics TU (CDM) (Nepali: गणित केन्द्रीय बिभाग) is one of the oldest department of  science education under the Tribhuvan University, Nepal. The CDM was established in September 20, 1959 (बि.स. आस्विन ४,२०१६).  Central Department of Mathematics is as old as the Tribhuvan University itself. The department offers M.Sc., M.Phil. and Ph.D. courses in Mathematics.

History 
The CDM was founded in September 20, 1959 (बि.स. आस्विन ४,२०१६).

Offered programs
The department offers M.Sc., M.Phil. and Ph.D. courses in Mathematics.

Student organization
The organization Nepal Mathematics Student Association (NeMSA)  serves as a student organization.

Publication
The Department publishes several research works in mathematical sciences in collaboration with Nepal Mathematical Society.

See also
Nepal Mathematical Society
Association of Nepalese Mathematicians in America

References

External links

 A History of Mathematical Sciences in Nepal

Schools of mathematics
Educational organisations based in Nepal
Tribhuvan University
1959 establishments in Nepal